Alexander Wolff is a writer for Sports Illustrated and former owner of the Vermont Frost Heaves of the Premier Basketball League (PBL).

He has written several books about basketball, among them Big Game, Small World, a look at basketball around the world. His most notable and notorious work was a feature article in Sports Illustrated from June 12, 1995, entitled "Why the University of Miami Should Drop Football." In it, Wolff wrote an open letter to then University of Miami president Edward T. Foote II claiming that the Hurricanes were a "disease" that had ruined the school's image and needed to be at least temporarily shut down. Wolff wrote a follow-up letter in 2011 to the then-current UM president, Donna Shalala, following the Nevin Shapiro booster controversy. Endpapers: A Family Story of Books, War, Escape, and Home, Wolff's memoir of his father and grandfather,  and observations drawn from his year living in Berlin, appeared in 2021.

References

American male journalists
Living people
American sportswriters
Place of birth missing (living people)
Year of birth missing (living people)